Sir Robert John Devereux, KCB (born 15 January 1957) is a retired senior British civil servant, who served as Permanent Secretary for the Department for Transport from 2007 to 2011, and oversaw a new policy increasing the UK retirement age to 67 at the Department for Work and Pensions from 2011 until his retirement at 61 in January 2018.

Education

Devereux was educated at St John's College, Oxford between 1975 and 1978, before studying for a master's degree at the University of Edinburgh.

Career
Devereux joined the Civil Service in 1979; until 1983 he worked in the Overseas Development Administration, before working at HM Treasury until 1994. He was with the Department of Social Security between 1996 and 2001. From 2007 to 2011, Devereux was Permanent Secretary at the Department for Transport. He became Permanent Secretary at the Department for Work and Pensions (DWP) on 1 January 2011. As of 2015, Devereux was paid a salary of between £180,000 and £184,999 by the department.

In 2013, it was reported that the Cabinet Secretary, Sir Jeremy Heywood, informed the Prime Minister David Cameron that he was concerned about the "concerted political briefing campaign" against Devereux over failures in the DWP's Universal Credit programme.

Sir Robert was the key architect of the state retirement age increase to 68 years

On 11 October 2017, it was announced that Sir Robert would retire from his post on his 61st birthday. He was succeeded by Peter Schofield, at that point the department's Director-General for Finance, in January 2018.

Honours

Devereux was appointed Knight Commander of the Order of the Bath (KCB) in the 2016 New Year Honours for services to transport and welfare and for voluntary service in Kilburn, London.

See also
 Viscount Hereford

References

External links
 Debrett's People of Today

1957 births
Living people
Alumni of St John's College, Oxford
Alumni of the University of Edinburgh
Robert
Knights Commander of the Order of the Bath
Permanent Under-Secretaries of State for Transport
Permanent Under-Secretaries of State for Work and Pensions